KIO  (KDE Input/Output) is a system library incorporated into KDE Frameworks 5 and KDE Software Compilation 4. It provides access to files, web sites and other resources through a single consistent API.  Applications, such as Konqueror and Dolphin, which are written using this framework, can operate on files stored on remote servers in exactly the same way as they operate on those stored locally, effectively making KDE network-transparent. This allows for an application like Konqueror to be both a file manager as well as a web browser.

KIO slaves are libraries that provide support for individual protocols (e.g. HTTP, FTP, SMB, SSH, FISH, SFTP, SVN, TAR).

The KDE manual app KHelpCenter has a KIOSlaves section that lists the available protocols with a short description of each.

See also 
 GIO and GVfs – provides equivalent functionality for GNOME, XFCE and Cinnamon

References

External links 
 KIO API documentation
 A Quick and Easy Guide to KDE KIO slaves, by Tavis J. Hampton

KDE Frameworks
KDE Platform